Novomikhaylovka is a rural locality (a selo) and the administrative center of Novomikhaylovsky Selsoviet of Oktyabrsky District, Amur Oblast, Russia. The population was 416 as of 2018. There are 8 streets.

Geography 
Novomikhaylovka is located 22 km southeast of Yekaterinoslavka (the district's administrative centre) by road. Sergeye-Fyodorovka is the nearest rural locality.

References 

Rural localities in Oktyabrsky District, Amur Oblast